Goodenia concinna is a species of flowering plant in the family Goodeniaceae and endemic to coastal area of southern Western Australia. It is a perennial, herb with linear to lance-shaped leaves, and racemes of yellow or cream-coloured flowers.

Description

Taxonomy and naming
Goodenia concinna was first formally described in 1868 by George Bentham in Flora Australiensis. The specific epithet (concinna) means "neat, pretty or elegant".

Distribution and habitat
This goodenia grows in sandy heath and forest near the south coast of Western Australia.

Conservation status
Goddenia concinna is classified as "not threatened" by the Department of Environment and Conservation (Western Australia).

References

concinna
Eudicots of Western Australia
Plants described in 1830
Taxa named by George Bentham